John Clough (born 13 September 1984 in St. Helens) is a former  rugby league footballer playing over 250 games for Salford City Reds (2001–06), London Broncos, Halifax (2006), Leigh Centurions (2007), Blackpool Panthers (2007-10), Oldham (2011-14) and Oxford (2015) as a . John Clough is a former Lancashire and Great Britain Academy representative.

Genealogical information
John Clough is brother of the rugby league footballer, Paul Clough.

References

External links
Statistics at rugbyleagueproject.org

1984 births
Living people
Blackpool Panthers players
English rugby league players
Halifax R.L.F.C. players
Leigh Leopards players
London Broncos players
Oldham R.L.F.C. players
Oxford Rugby League players
Rugby articles needing expert attention
Rugby league hookers
Rugby league players from St Helens, Merseyside
Salford Red Devils players